Raúl Santos Galván Villanueva (born 1 December 1944) is a Mexican politician affiliated with the PRI. As of 2013 he served as Deputy of the LXII Legislature of the Mexican Congress representing Sinaloa.

References

1944 births
Living people
Politicians from Monterrey
Institutional Revolutionary Party politicians
21st-century Mexican politicians
Deputies of the LXII Legislature of Mexico
Members of the Chamber of Deputies (Mexico) for Sinaloa